Dorothy Violet Wellesley, Duchess of Wellington ( Ashton; 30 July 1889 – 11 July 1956), styled Lady Gerald Wellesley between 1914 and 1943, was an English author, poet, literary editor and socialite.

Background

She was born in White Waltham, the daughter of Col. Robert Ashton of Croughton, Cheshire (himself a second cousin of the 1st Baron Ashton of Hyde), descended from wealthy cotton manufacturers, and his wife (Lucy) Cecilia Dunn-Gardner (later Countess of Scarbrough), and stepdaughter of the 10th Earl of Scarbrough.

Poetry
As Dorothy Wellesley, the name she took after her marriage to Lord Gerald Wellesley, she was the author of more than ten books, mostly of poetry, but including also Sir George Goldie, Founder of Nigeria (1934), and Far Have I Travelled (1952). She was editor for Hogarth Press of the Hogarth Living Poets series. She also edited The Annual in 1929.

According to W. B. Yeats, Wellesley was one of the greatest writers of the twentieth century - see his Introduction to the Oxford Book of Modern Verse 1892–1935. "Within two minutes of our first meeting at my house he said: ‘You must sacrifice  everything and everyone to your poetry'". 

Yeats discovered her poetry while researching the Oxford Book of Modern Verse and said "My eyes filled with tears. I read in excitement that was more delightful because it showed that I had not lost my understanding of poetry." Only later did he find who she was and what was her station in life.

Yeats scholar R. F. Foster, however, has written that she was "a moderately accomplished if minor poet" though adding that "the quality of some of her work has been vindicated by time".

She was introduced to Yeats in 1935, and he eventually would edit and revise her poems as well as soliciting her comments on his works. Together they edited the second series of Broadsides: New Irish & English Songs in 1937.  Yeats spent much of his final time towards the end of his life with Wellesley at her Sussex home, and she would be at his deathbed in 1939.

Marriage
Dorothy Ashton married Lord Gerald Wellesley (later 7th Duke of Wellington), on 30 April 1914; they separated in 1922 but did not divorce.

They had two children:

 Valerian Wellesley, 8th Duke of Wellington (2 July 1915 – 31 December 2014)
 Lady Elizabeth Wellesley (26 December 1918 – 25 November 2013)

Lesbianism
Dorothy Wellesley became the lover of Vita Sackville-West, for whom she left her husband and children in 1922, according to a memoir published in 2009 by her granddaughter, Lady Jane Wellesley. 

After that relationship ended, for eight years she became the lover and companion of Hilda Matheson (1888–1940), a BBC producer who lived in "Rocks Farm" in the grounds of her house in the Sussex village of Withyham called "Penns-in-the-Rocks". A certain distance was called for due to Dorothy's (family nickname "Dotty") sometimes erratic and demanding behaviour. This relationship, a key stabilizer in both their lives, ended tragically with the death of Hilda during a routine thyroid operation.

Death

The Duchess of Wellington died at Withyham, Sussex. After her death, her widower proposed to her half-sister, Lady Serena James ( Lumley), widow of his former brother-in-law the Hon. Robert James), but she refused him.

In popular culture 
She was one of a series of society beauties photographed as classical figures by Madame Yevonde.
Dorothy Wellesley is portrayed by Karla Crome in the 2018 film Vita and Virginia.

References

Sources 
 Letters on Poetry from W. B. Yeats to Dorothy Wellesley (1940, Oxford University Press) edited by Kathleen Raine

1889 births
1956 deaths
Dorothy Wellesley, Duchess of Wellington
English socialites
British duchesses by marriage
English women poets
People from Maidenhead
20th-century English poets
20th-century English women writers
English LGBT writers
Wives of knights